The 2009 Munster Senior Football Championship was that year's installment of the annual Munster Senior Football Championship held under the auspices of the Munster GAA. It was won by Cork who defeated Limerick in the final. It was their first time to retain the title in 14 years. Limerick had not won a Munster title since 1896. After Cork's defeat of Kerry in the semi-final there were concerns that Kerry football was in "terminal decline."

The winning Cork team received the  Munster Championship Cup, and automatically advanced to the quarter-final stage of the 2009 All-Ireland Senior Football Championship.

Bracket

Quarter-finals

Semi-finals

Final

References

External links
Munster GAA website

2M
Munster Senior Football Championship